Jeevana Vima Nagara is a residential area of east Bangalore. The area extends from the Indiranagar 80 Feet Road in the west to Suranjandas Road in the east. Sublocalties like New Thippasandra, HAL 3rd Stage, Geethanjali Layout, Annayappa Garden, Anandapuram, Shivalingaiah Colony, Kullappa Colony, Sudhama Nagar, BDA Layout and Nanja Reddy Colony are also considered a part of Jeevana Vima Nagara.

Originally, the area was developed for the employees of LIC and KPWD. Therefore, the area predominantly consists of LIC quarters (types L, M, N, P) and KPWD quarters (types A,B,C & D). However, in recent times, due to its proximity to the IT Corridor and the fact that it is a cheaper alternative to Indiranagar, the main hub of East Bangalore, many non-Kannadigas have settled here.

It is well connected by BMTC buses from major bus stations of Bangalore.

Jeevana Vima Nagara was a purely residential area, but recently many shops and IT companies have come up on the 10th Main Road. ISRO and NAL also have their offices here. The 1st Main Road (BEML Main Road) is a major shopping centre in the area. Kendriya Vidyalaya NAL is located closely near to its bus stop.

References

Neighbourhoods in Bangalore